Indivisible is a progressive movement and organization in the United States initiated in 2016 as a reaction to the election of Donald Trump as President of the United States. The movement began with the online publication of a handbook written by Congressional staffers with suggestions for peacefully but effectively resisting the move to the right in the executive branch of the United States government under the Trump administration that was widely anticipated and feared by progressives. According to Peter Dreier, the goal of Indivisible is to "save American democracy" and "resume the project of creating a humane America that is more like social democracy than corporate plutocracy."

In 2019, Indivisible's Leah Greenberg and Ezra Levin were included in Time Magazine's 100 Most Influential People of 2019.

Origin 

The movement started with the online publication of a 23-page handbook, Indivisible: A Practical Guide for Resisting the Trump Agenda. The authors of the document, most notably Ezra Levin, Jeremy Haile, Leah Greenberg, and Angel Padilla, were former Congressional staffers. Greenberg worked as an aide to Democratic Representative Tom Perriello of Virginia, while Levin, Greenberg's husband, worked as an aide to Lloyd Doggett, a Democratic Party member of the United States House of Representatives from Texas. After the 2016 presidential election, in mid-December 2016, Levin and Greenberg began working on an online guide in the form of a Google Document on how to make contact with congressional aides as a way of grieving over Trump's victory. Angel Padilla, and Jeremy Haile, and dozens of other staffers for Democratic members of the United States Congress joined in the creation of the online publication.

The authors modeled their document after the Tea Party movement, which focused on local activism and obstructing the Democratic Party's agenda following the election of President Barack Obama in 2008. They thought that similar action taken by the left could be effective against what they perceived as Trump's "bigoted and anti-democratic agenda". The purpose of the guide was to encourage resistance to Trump's presidency, most notably by targeting Republican elected members of Congress by attending town halls, calling congressional officials, visiting their offices, and showing up at public events.

It was first published online on Google Docs on December 14, 2016, with Levin posting a link to it on his personal Twitter account. It soon went viral, with, among others, Robert Reich, Jonathan Chait, George Takei and Miranda July circulating it online.

History 

Since the guide's publication, its authors have created a website with further resources on using the guide and organizing local movements. The guide is continuously updated and is available in English and Spanish. By February 4, 2017, less than two months from the publication of the Indivisible Guide, and about two weeks after Trump's inauguration, more than 3,800 local groups identifying as "Indivisibles" had formed and declared their support for the movement. In February, they organized as a 501(c) organization.

Many groups attended town halls, demonstrated against nominees for Trump's Cabinet, and worked with organizers of the Women's March. John Kasich and Mo Brooks acknowledged that the protests would impact efforts to repeal the Patient Protection and Affordable Care Act. David Weigel said the movement was a possible reason for the initial failure of Republicans to pass the American Health Care Act of 2017.

In 2018, the group and its volunteers contributed money, endorsement and volunteer time to many House races, which was followed by Democrats winning back control of the chamber. In 2019, the group endorsed a series of events aimed at supporting the impeachment of Donald Trump.

The group continued its advocacy activities into the post-Trump era; in 2021, Indivisible advocated in favor of Democrats' $3.5 trillion reconciliation bill. In October 2021, Indivisible planned to spend $1 million to protect eight Democratic incumbents in Congress, an effort that overlapped partly with that of the Democratic Congressional Campaign Committee. In June 2022, Indivisible planned to spend $7 million.

See also
 Tea Party movement

References

Further reading

External links

 

2016 in American politics
2017 in American politics
21st-century social movements
Aftermath of the 2016 United States presidential election
Civil liberties advocacy groups in the United States
Immigration political advocacy groups in the United States
Left-wing populism in the United States
LGBT political advocacy groups in the United States
Liberalism in the United States
Political advocacy groups in the United States
Political terminology of the United States
Progressivism in the United States
Protests in the United States
Social democratic organizations in the United States